The 2018 AFC Women's Asian Cup qualification was the qualification tournament for the 2018 AFC Women's Asian Cup.

A total of 21 teams entered the qualification tournament, which decided four of the eight participating teams in the final tournament held in Jordan. This tournament also served as the first stage of Asian qualification for the 2019 FIFA Women's World Cup, with the top five teams of the final tournament qualifying for the World Cup.

Draw
Of the 47 AFC member associations, a total of 24 teams entered the competition, with Japan, Australia, and China PR automatically qualified for the final tournament by their position as the top three teams of the 2014 AFC Women's Asian Cup and thus did not participate in the qualifying competition. Jordan also automatically qualified for the final tournament as hosts, but decided to also participate in the qualifying competition.

The draw was held on 21 January 2017, 15:00 AST (UTC+2), at the Grand Hyatt in Amman, Jordan. The 21 teams were drawn into one group of six teams and three groups of five teams.

The teams were seeded according to their performance in the 2014 AFC Women's Asian Cup final tournament and qualification. The following restrictions were also applied:
The four teams which indicated their intention to serve as qualification group hosts prior to the draw were drawn into separate groups.
As Iran and Syria had indicated they would not travel to Palestine, they would not be drawn into the group hosted by Palestine.

Notes
Teams in bold qualified for the final tournament.
(H): Qualification group hosts
(Q): Automatically qualified for final tournament regardless of qualification results
(W): Withdrew after draw

Did not enter

 (suspended)

Format
In each group, teams played each other once at a centralised venue. The four group winners qualified for the final tournament. If Jordan won their group, the runner-up of their group also qualified for the final tournament.

Tiebreakers
Teams were ranked according to points (3 points for a win, 1 point for a draw, 0 points for a loss), and if tied on points, the following tiebreaking criteria were applied, in the order given, to determine the rankings (Regulations Article 11.5):
Points in head-to-head matches among tied teams;
Goal difference in head-to-head matches among tied teams;
Goals scored in head-to-head matches among tied teams;
If more than two teams are tied, and after applying all head-to-head criteria above, a subset of teams are still tied, all head-to-head criteria above are reapplied exclusively to this subset of teams;
Goal difference in all group matches;
Goals scored in all group matches;
Penalty shoot-out if only two teams are tied and they met in the last round of the group;
Disciplinary points (yellow card = 1 point, red card as a result of two yellow cards = 3 points, direct red card = 3 points, yellow card followed by direct red card = 4 points);
Drawing of lots.

Groups
The matches were played between 3–12 April 2017.

Group A
All matches were held in Tajikistan.
Times listed were UTC+5.

Group B
All matches were held in North Korea.
Times listed were UTC+8:30.

Group C
All matches were held in Palestine.
Times listed were UTC+3.

Group D
All matches were held in Vietnam.
Times listed were UTC+7.

Qualified teams
The following eight teams qualified for the final tournament.

1 Bold indicates champions for that year. Italic indicates hosts for that year.

Goalscorers

References

External links
, the-AFC.com
AFC Women's Asian Cup 2018, stats.the-AFC.com

Qualification
AFC Women's Asian Cup qualification
Women's Asian Cup qualification
AFC Women's Asian Cup qualification
AFC Women's Asian Cup qualification
South Korea at the 2019 FIFA Women's World Cup
Thailand at the 2019 FIFA Women's World Cup